Irma Capece Minutolo (born 6 August 1935) is an Italian former opera singer who was one of the last companions of King Farouk I of Egypt. In recent years, she claims she was the king's last wife, and now uses the name Irma Capece Minutolo Farouk.

Background

She was born in Naples, Italy, reportedly a daughter of Augusto Capece Minutolo.

In 1954, Time reported that Capece Minutolo's "right to be called a marchioness was recently disputed when two Italian newsmen declared that her parents were a chauffeur and a janitor's daughter."  A trial for slander resulted, though its outcome is unknown.

Career

In addition to her opera career, Capece Minutolo appeared in several motion pictures:
Napoletani a Milano (1953)
Siamo Ricchi e Poveri (1954)
Young Toscanini (1988, role: Signora Martelli), a Franco Zeffirelli film starring Elizabeth Taylor and C. Thomas Howell
Mutande Pazze (1992)
Boom (1992)

Declaration of marriage to King Farouk I

In 2005, in an interview with Al-Ahram Weekly, Capece Minutolo said that she married Farouk "in the Islamic tradition" when she was 16 and that she was writing a memoir of her life as the king's wife.
	
Published sources such as Time magazine indicate that Capece Minutolo was born in 1935, which would place her supposed marriage at the age of 16 in 1951. That is the same year that the king married his second wife Narriman Sadek.
 
Capece Minutolo also has stated that she and Farouk had been married, at the time of his death in 1965, for a total of eight years, which would mean that the purported ceremony took place in 1957. However, in 1954, Time, describing Capece Minutolo as "his current traveling companion, a voluptuous Neapolitan", stated that the singer had declined to marry the deposed monarch, claiming, "Farouk is sensible and tender, but marriage is the tomb of love." Six years later, the couple's legal status had not changed, since Time described the singer as the former king's "one conspicuous indulgence: buxom, blonde Irma Capece Minuto [sic], his on-again-off-again sweetheart, whom Farouk may marry sometime." However, in Farouk's death notice, published in The New York Times, Capece Minutolo was identified as "Farouk's constant companion in recent years."
 
She further has stated that she was 24 when Farouk died, in 1965, which would place her birth year as 1941. In February 1954, however, the same month that King Farouk and Queen Narriman divorced, Time referred to the singer as the King's "latest collector's item" and gave her age as 18, which would place her birth in 1935, given her birthday (6 August).
 
Capece Minutolo's claim of having married the exiled Egyptian monarch has not been substantiated.

References

	

Italian opera singers
1935 births
Living people
Musicians from Naples